Berry Campbell Gallery is an art gallery in the Chelsea neighborhood of New York City. Its founders and directors are Christine Berry and Martha Campbell. The gallery focuses on historical and contemporary artists associated with American modernism.

History 

Christine Berry and Martha Campbell met while both were working at the Spanierman Gallery. They established Berry Campbell Gallery in 2013. In 2015, Berry Campbell Gallery took over a neighboring gallery space and expanded to 4,000 square feet. In September of 2022 it moved to a 9,000 square foot location formerly occupied by Paula Cooper Gallery and Robert Miller Gallery.

Program 
Berry Campbell Gallery specializes in American abstract expressionism, with an emphasis on artists who have been historically overlooked due to their gender, age, or race. In a 2020 interview with Surface, Berry said that she and Campbell "discovered a gap in the Chelsea art scene: a few galleries showed artists that were well-respected back in their day, but for whatever reason—whether it was race, gender, or geography—they had fallen off the map. We felt that our role could be bringing these postwar and abstract expressionist artists back to the forefront by telling their stories and showcasing their contributions to the movement."

Berry Campbell Gallery exhibitions have been widely reviewed by critics including Roberta Smith, Peter Plagens, and Donald Kuspit.

Selected artists represented 

 Edward Avedisian

 Walter Darby Bannard

 Stanley Boxer

 Dan Christensen

 Lynne Mapp Drexler

 Perle Fine

 Judith Godwin

 Raymond Hendler

 Ida Kohlmeyer

 Jill Nathanson

 John Opper

 Elizabeth Osborne

 Stephen Pace

 Charlotte Park

 William Perehudoff

 Ann Purcell

 Syd Solomon

 Yvonne Thomas

 Frank Wimberley

 Larry Zox

External links 
Berry Campbell Gallery website

References 

Art museums and galleries in Manhattan
Contemporary art galleries in the United States